Ramphotyphlops adocetus is a species of blind snake that is endemic to Micronesia. The specific epithet adocetus (“unexpected” or “surprising”) refers to the unexpected discovery of this snake on a remote atoll.

Distribution
The species occurs in the Caroline Islands in the Federated States of Micronesia. The type locality is Pasa Island, Ant Atoll.

References

 
adocetus
Reptiles of Oceania
Endemic fauna of the Federated States of Micronesia
Reptiles described in 2012